Shek Kip Mei,  is an area in New Kowloon, to the northeast of the Kowloon Peninsula of Hong Kong. It borders Sham Shui Po and Kowloon Tong.

History

At the time of the 1911 census, the population of Shek Kip Mei was 72.

A major fire on 25 December 1953 destroyed the Shek Kip Mei shanty town of immigrants from Mainland China who had fled to Hong Kong, leaving 53,000 people homeless.

After the fire, the governor Alexander Grantham launched a public housing programme to introduce the idea of multi-storey building for the immigrant population living there. The standardised new structures offered fire- and flood-resistant construction to previously vulnerable hut dwellers. The programme involved demolishing the rest of the makeshift houses left untouched by the fire, and the construction of the Shek Kip Mei Low-cost Housing Estate in their stead. Each unit could house five people, and each building had a capacity of 2,500 residents.The rent was HK$17 per square foot per month, while the rent for a commercial store downstairs was HK$100 per month. Foreign tourists visiting the apartment complexes referred to them as "prisons". Some scholars have argued that the government has been overstating the role of the fire in the history of public housing in Hong Kong.

At the north of Shek Kip Mei is Tai Wo Ping, along Beacon Hill. This was a cottage area (a type of resettlement accommodation) from the 1950s to 1970s, but it has been developed into a public housing estate, Chak On Estate, and two private housing estates, Beacon Heights and Dynasty Heights.

Present

The Government has backed off from its plans to redevelop the area, following great opposition from many who believe they symbolised the history of Hong Kong. An alternative plan to renovate it for use as a hostel and museum has been completed. The museum includes restored rooms, resident stories and photos, and documentation of the history of public housing estates.

Shek Kip Mei now has several types of housing including the public apartments, Pak Tin Estate and private housing such as Beacon Heights and Dynasty Heights. Several malls and churches can also be found in the area now.

The old Shek Kip Mei Factory Estate was renovated and now serves as the Jockey Club Creative Arts Centre.

Transportation
Since 1 October 1979, it has been served by Shek Kip Mei station on the MTR at Woh Chai Street and Wai Chi Street.

Route 7 passes to the north of the area and accessed via Nam Cheong Street.

KMB and New World First Bus operates a number or routes that travel within the area.

Education
Shek Kip Mei is in Primary One Admission (POA) School Net 40. Within the school net are multiple aided schools (operated independently but funded with government money) and two government schools: Fuk Wing Street Government Primary School and Li Cheng Uk Government Primary School.

See also
 Public housing in Hong Kong
 Shek Kip Mei Estate and Mei Ho House
 North Kowloon Magistracy
 Woh Chai Shan aka. Shek Kip Mei Hill aka. Bishop Hill, a hill in Shek Kip Mei

References

External links

 Pictures of the 1953 fire and early resettlement buildings
 Jockey Club Creative Arts Centre project website
 Video showing Shek Kip Mei just after the fire

 
Places in Hong Kong
Sham Shui Po District
New Kowloon
Former squats